Cosas del Amor may refer to:
Cosas del Amor (Vikki Carr album), 1991
Cosas del Amor (Enrique Iglesias album), 1998
"Cosas del Amor" (song), a 1991 song performed by Vikki Carr and Ana Gabriel
"Cosas del Amor", 2005 song by Sergio Vega